Maria Farantouri or Farandouri (born 28 November 1947 in Athens) is a Greek singer and also a political and cultural activist. She has collaborated with Greek composers such as Mikis Theodorakis, who wrote the score for Pablo Neruda's Canto General, which Farantouri performed all over the world.

During the Greek military junta of 1967–1974, Maria Farantouri recorded protest songs in Europe with Mikis Theodorakis. In 1971, she recorded Songs and Guitar Pieces by Theodorakis with Australian guitarist John Williams which included seven poems by Federico García Lorca. She has recorded songs in Spanish ('Hasta Siempre Comandante Che Guevara'), Italian, and English ("Joe Hill" and Elisabeth Hauptmann's Alabama Song from Bertolt Brecht's Rise and Fall of the City of Mahagonny), George Gershwin's works, as well as works by Greek composers Manos Hatzidakis, Eleni Karaindrou and Vangelis.

Her voice is contralto with two octaves. The international press called her a people's Callas (The Daily Telegraph), and the Joan Baez of the Mediterranean (Le Monde).
 
Maria Farantouri was an elected member of the Greek Parliament from 1989 to 1993 representing the Panhellenic Socialist Movement (PASOK). She is married to the poet and former politician Tilemachos Chytiris.

On 23 September 2004, the President of the Hellenic Republic recognized the contribution of Maria Farantouri to Greek song, awarding her the Gold Cross of the Order of the Phoenix. She was awarded the Premio Tenco Italian Award 2014 for her contribution to international contemporary and traditional music, and the Spanish LiberPress 2017.

Discography
 John Williams Maria Farandouri: Mikis Theodorakis – Songs Of Freedom (1974)
 Maria Farantouri: Mosaic (Libra, 2004)
 Maria Farantouri: Live im Olympia (Plane, 1987)
 Maria Farantouri: 17 Songs (EMI, 1990)
 Maria Farantouri: Tou Feggariou Ta Pathi (Afieroma Sto Federico García Lorca) (Live concert 1996)
 Maria Farantouri: Way Home (Peregrina, 2007)
 Mikis Theodorakis: Sinfonietta, Farantouri, Frankfurt Chamber Orchestra (Intuition, 1999)
 Mikis Theodorakis: The Ballad of Mauthausen-Farantouri Cycle (1966)
 Mikis Theodorakis: Poetica (Peregrina, 1998)
 Mikis Theodorakis: Asmata (Peregrina, 1998)
 Mikis Theodorakis: Canto General (various versions)
 Mikis Theodorakis: Pnevmatiko Emvatirio (Live at Royal Albert Hall, London 1971)
 Manos Hadjidakis: The era of Mellisanthi (Lyra, 1981)
 Eleni Karaindrou: Elegy of the Uprooting (ECM, 2005)
 Charles Lloyd & Maria Farantouri: Athens Concert 2CDs (ECM, 2010)
 Maria Farantouri: Maria Farantouri Sings Taner Akyol – Maria Farantouri sings in Greek translation poems of the persecution suffered by the Kurdish people.
 Mauthausen Trilogy (Plane, 2000)
 Maria Farantouri: I Triti Porta (The Third Door). Music by Lena Platonos (Minos, 2000)
 Maria Farantouri Sings George Gershwin (Legend, 2007)
 Maria Farantouri: Afieroma Ston Miki Theodoraki (Melody Maker, 2008)
 Maria Farantouri, Hthes Archisa na Tragoudo (I began Singing Yesterday) Live at Herodes Atticus Odeon, 2 CDs, DVD (Minos, 2014)
 Maria Farantouri – Cihan Turkoglu, Beyond the Borders (ECM 2019)

References

1947 births
Living people
Singers from Athens
Greek entehno singers
20th-century Greek women singers
PASOK politicians
Greek MPs 1990–1993
20th-century Greek women politicians
21st-century Greek women singers
Politicians from Athens
Gold Crosses of the Order of the Phoenix (Greece)